Sredny Rubezh is a rural locality (a village) in Almozerskoye Rural Settlement, Vytegorsky District, Vologda Oblast, Russia. The population was 2 as of 2002.

Geography 
Sredny Rubezh is located 41 km southeast of Vytegra (the district's administrative centre) by road. Verkhny Rubezh is the nearest rural locality.

References 

Rural localities in Vytegorsky District